Sevenitini Toumoʻua is a Tongan politician and Cabinet Minister.

Politics 
He was a candidate in the 2011 Tongatapu 9 by-election.

He was elected to the Legislative Assembly of Tonga at the 2021 Tongan general election. On 28 December 2021 he was appointed to the Cabinet of Siaosi Sovaleni as Minister for Infrastructure.

References 

Living people
Members of the Legislative Assembly of Tonga
Government ministers of Tonga
Independent politicians in Tonga
Year of birth missing (living people)